Dejan Parezanović (born 16 April 1994) is a Serbian football defender, who plays for Sloga Kraljevo. His trademark is a very long throw. His older brother, Dragan, is also a footballer.

Club career

Sloga Kraljevo
Born in Kraljevo, Parezanović started playing football with local football academy Bubamara. Later he moved to Sloga Kraljevo, where he passed all youth categories. He joined the first team for the 2011–12 Serbian First League season, and made 2 caps for the spring 2012. He spent 2012–13 season with U19 team, and after ended his youth career, Dejan was loaned to Partizan Bumbarevo Brdo for the 2013–14 season.

2014–15 season
Parezanović returned in Sloga for the 2014–15 season, after almost the whole squad from the past season left the club. He started season as the first choice, but after several lost matches in row and without points, Borko Milenković signed for Sloga and Parezanović moved on the bench. However, after several players left the club after bad results, Milenković changed position to centre-back, so Parezanović returned in starting 11 for the 9th fixture match against BSK Borča, and played the rest of matches until the first half-season. For the spring part of season, coach Veljko Dovedan just used him for a match against Proleter Novi Sad.

2015–16 season
After Sloga relegated to the Serbian League West, Parezanović stayed in the club as one of the experienced players along with captain Aleksandar Božović and a group of youth players. He scored a goal in the opening match of the 2015–16 Serbian League West season, against Šumadija 1903. Later, he was a scorer in a match against Polet Ljubić in the 3rd fixture and also made an assist on that game, so he was nominated for man of the match. In a cup match against Mokra Gora played on 2 September 2015, Parezanović scored a goal for the regular time, and later also scored one in the penalty shootout. He also scored a goal versus FAP. With total 3 goals on 13 league matches and 1 in cup, all from penalties, Parezanović was the team's best scorer for the first half-season. In the winter break off-season, he left the club.

Bežanija and Spartak Subotica
At the beginning of 2016, Parezanović moved to Bežanija. He made one appearance for the club in an away match against Dinamo Vranje. That summer, he signed with Serbian SuperLiga side Spartak Subotica, but moved on loan to Bačka 1901 shortly afterward. For the second half-season, Parezanović optionally loaned to OFK Odžaci, but also stayed with the Spartak reserves, playing friendly matches with the first team.

Return to Sloga Kraljevo
In August 2017, Parezanović returned to his home club Sloga Kraljevo. He scored from penalty kick on his premiere match in 5–0 home victory over Dragačevo. After he replaced suspended Vladimir Čolić as a left-back in the third fixture match of the 2017–18 season in the Morava Zone League, Parezanović adapted as a centre-back since the next fixture match. He also realised penalty shot against Slavija Kragujevac, same month. He scored his third season goal in 15 fixture match against Jošanica. Parezanović has been promoted as a captain in a match against on 5 May 2018, when he was also elected for a player of the match in 0–0 draw to Takovo.

Career statistics

References

External links
 

1994 births
Living people
Sportspeople from Kraljevo
Association football defenders
Serbian footballers
FK Sloga Kraljevo players
FK Bežanija players
FK Spartak Subotica players
FK Bačka 1901 players
Serbian First League players